Le Boulevard de  Montmartre, Matinée de Printemps is a painting of Paris' Boulevard Montmartre by Camille Pissarro.

On 5 February 2014 it was auctioned at Sotheby's, London, for £19,682,500, double its pre-sale estimate.

Provenance 
 Galerie Durand-Ruel, Paris (acquired from the artist on 2 June 1898)
 Mr Burke, London (acquired from the above on 11 January 1899)
 Arthur Tooth & Sons, London
 Galerie Durand-Ruel, Paris (acquired from the above on 14 August 1901)
 Paul Cassirer, Berlin (acquired from the above on 13 October 1902)
 Adolf Rothermundt, Dresden (acquired circa 1914)
 Max Silberberg, Breslau (acquired by 1923)
 Sale: Paul Graupe, Berlin, 23 March 1935, lot 27 (forced sale by Max Silberberg)
 Alfred & Marie Erlich, New York
 Nathan J. & Sara N. Cohn, Mount Vernon (acquired from the above)
 Knoedler & Co., New York (acquired from the above on 9 November 1959)
 John & Frances L. Loeb, New York (acquired from the above on 4 January 1960)
 The American Friends of The Israel Museum, Jerusalem (a bequest from the above in 1997)
 The Israel Museum, Jerusalem (a gift from the above in 1997)
 Restituted to Gerta Silberberg on 1 February 2000, and placed on loan with The Israel Museum until 2013

Exhibition history 
 Paris, Galerie Durand-Ruel, Œuvres récentes de Camille Pissarro, 1898, no. 24
 St. Petersburg, Société Impériale d’Encouragement des Arts, Expositions française des Beaux-Arts et des Arts décoratifs, 1899, no. 274
 Rheims, Société des Amis des Arts, 16e Exposition générale, 1901, no. 563
 Dresden, Galerie Ernst Arnold, Ausstellung von Gemälden französischer Künstler, 1902, no. 26
 Dresden, Galerie Ernst Arnold, Französische Malerei des XIX. Jahrhunderts, 1914, no. 79
 New York, Wildenstein & Co., C. Pissarro, 1965, no. 66
 New York, Wildenstein & Co., ‘One Hundred Years of Impressionism’: A Tribute to Durand-Ruel, 1970, no. 88, illustrated in the catalogue
 Dallas, Dallas Museum of Art; Philadelphia, Philadelphia Museum of Art & London, Royal Academy of Arts, The Impressionist and the City: Pissarro’s Series Paintings, 1992–93, no. 51, illustrated in colour in the catalogue
 Rovereto, Museo d'Arte Moderna e Contemporanea di Trento e Rovereto, Impressionists and Post-Impressionists: Masterpieces from the Israel Museum of Jerusalem, 2008–09, no. 6

See also
List of paintings by Camille Pissarro
Boulevard Montmartre: Mardi Gras (1897 Pissarro painting)
Holocaust in Germany

Notes

Citations

Bibliography 
 Mauclair,Camille. The French Impressionists, London & New York, 1903, illustrated p. 2.
 Pissarro, Joachim and Snollaerts, Claire Durand-Ruel. Pissarro, Critical Catalogue of Paintings, Paris, 2005, vol. III, no. 1171, illustrated in colour p. 736.
 Scheffler, Karl. Die Sammlung Max Silberberg, in Kunst und Künstler, October 1931, mentioned p. 12.

External links

1897 paintings
Paintings by Camille Pissarro
Horses in art